Sindhi is an Indo-Aryan language spoken by about 30 million people in the Pakistani province of Sindh, where it has official status. It is also spoken by a further 1.7 million people in India, where it is a scheduled language, without any state-level official status. The main writing system is the Perso-Arabic script, which accounts for the majority of the Sindhi literature and is the only one currently used in Pakistan. In India, both the Perso-Arabic script and Devanagari are used.

Sindhi has an attested history from the 10th century CE. Sindhi was one of the first Indo-Aryan languages to encounter influence from Persian and Arabic following the Umayyad conquest in 712 CE. A substantial body of Sindhi literature developed during the Medieval period, the most famous of which is the religious and mystic poetry of Shah Abdul Latif Bhittai from the 18th century. Modern Sindhi was promoted under British rule beginning in 1843, which led to the current status of the language in independent Pakistan after 1947.

History

Origins
The name "Sindhi" is derived from the Sanskrit síndhu, the original name of the Indus River, along whose delta Sindhi is spoken.

Like other languages of the Indo-Aryan family, Sindhi is descended from Old Indo-Aryan (Sanskrit) via Middle Indo-Aryan (Pali, secondary Prakrits, and Apabhramsha). 20th century Western scholars such as George Abraham Grierson believed that Sindhi descended specifically from the Vrācaḍa dialect of Apabhramsha (described by Markandeya as being spoken in Sindhu-deśa, corresponding to modern Sindh) but later work has shown this to be unlikely.

Early Sindhi (10th–16th centuries)
Sindhi entered the New Indo-Aryan stage around the 10th century CE. However, literary attestation of Sindhi from this period is sparse; early Isma'ili religious literature and poetry in India, as old as the 11th century CE, used a language that was closely related to Sindhi and Gujarati. Much of this work is in the form of ginans (a kind of devotional hymn).

Sindhi was the first Indo-Aryan language to be in close contact with Arabic and Persian following the Umayyad conquest of Sindh in 712 CE. According to Sindhi tradition, the first translation of the Quran into Sindhi was initiated in 883 CE in Mansura, Sindh. This is corroborated by the accounts of Al-Ramhormuzi but it is unclear whether the language of translation was actually a predecessor to Sindhi, nor is the text preserved.

Medieval Sindhi (16th–19th centuries)
Medieval Sindhi religious literature comprises a syncretic Sufi and Advaita Vedanta poetry, the latter in the devotional bhakti tradition. The earliest known Sindhi poet of the Sufi tradition is Qazi Qadan (1493–1551). Other early poets were Shah Inat Rizvi ( 1613–1701) and Shah Abdul Karim Bulri (1538–1623). These poets had a mystical bent that profoundly influenced Sindhi poetry for much of this period.

Another famous part of Medieval Sindhi literature is a wealth of folktales, adapted and readapted into verse by many bards at various times. These include romantic epics such as Sassui Punnhun, Sohni Mahiwal, Momal Rano, Noori Jam Tamachi, Lilan Chanesar, and others. The greatest poet of Sindhi was Shah Abdul Latif Bhittai (1689/1690–1752), whose verses were compiled into the Shah Jo Risalo by his followers. He weaved Sindhi folktales with Sufi mysticism.

The first attested Sindhi translation of the Quran was done by Akhund Azaz Allah Muttalawi (1747–1824) and published in Gujarat in 1870. The first to appear in print was by Muhammad Siddiq in 1867.

Modern Sindhi (1843–present)
Sindh was occupied by the British army and was annexed with the Bombay Presidency in 1843. Soon after, in 1848, Governor George Clerk established Sindhi as the official language in the province, removing the literary dominance of Persian. Sir Bartle Frere, the then commissioner of Sindh, issued orders on August 29, 1857, advising civil servants in Sindh to pass an examination in Sindhi. He also ordered the use of Sindhi in official documents. In 1868, the Bombay Presidency assigned Narayan Jagannath Vaidya to replace the Abjad used in Sindhi with the Khudabadi script. The script was decreed a standard script by the Bombay Presidency thus inciting anarchy in the Muslim majority region. A powerful unrest followed, after which Twelve Martial Laws were imposed by the British authorities. The granting of official status of Sindhi along with script reforms ushered in the development of modern Sindhi literature.

The first printed works in Sindhi were produced at the Muhammadi Press in Bombay beginning in 1867. These included Islamic stories set in verse by Muhammad Hashim Thattvi, one of the renowned religious scholars of Sindh.

The Partition of India in 1947 resulted in most Sindhi speakers ending up in the new state of Pakistan, commencing a push to establish a strong sub-national linguistic identity for Sindhi. This manifested in resistance to the imposition of Urdu and eventually Sindhi nationalism in the 1980s.

The language and literary style of contemporary Sindhi writings in Pakistan and India were noticeably diverging by the late 20th century; authors from the former country were borrowing extensively from Urdu, while those from the latter were highly influenced by Hindi.

Geographic distribution
In Pakistan, Sindhi is the first language of 30.26 million people, or % of the country's population as of the 2017 census. 29.5 million of these are found in Sindh, where they account for % of the total population of the province. There are 0.56 million speakers in the province of Balochistan, especially in the Kacchi Plain that encompasses the districts of Lasbela, Kachhi, Sibi, Jafarabad, Jhal Magsi, and Nasirabad.

In India, there were a total of 1.68 million speakers according to the 2011 census. The states with the largest numbers were Maharashtra, Rajasthan, Gujarat, and Madhya Pradesh.

Official status
Sindhi is the official language of the Pakistani province of Sindh and one of the scheduled languages of India, where it does not have any state-level status.

Prior to the inception of Pakistan, Sindhi was the national language of Sindh. 
The Pakistan Sindh Assembly has ordered compulsory teaching of the Sindhi language in all private schools in Sindh. According to the Sindh Private Educational Institutions Form B (Regulations and Control) 2005 Rules, "All educational institutions are required to teach children the Sindhi language. Sindh Education and Literacy Minister, Syed Sardar Ali Shah, and Secretary of School Education, Qazi Shahid Pervaiz, have ordered the employment of Sindhi teachers in all private schools in Sindh so that this language can be easily and widely taught. Sindhi is taught in all provincial private schools that follow the Matric system and not the ones that follow the Cambridge system.

At the occasion of 'Mother Language Day' in 2023, the Sindh Assembly under Culture minister Sardar Ali Shah, passed a unanimous resolution to extend the use of language to primary level and increase the status of Sindhi as the national language of Pakistan.

The Indian Government has legislated Sindhi as a scheduled language in India, making it an option for education. Despite lacking any state-level status, Sindhi is still a prominent minority language in the Indian state of Rajasthan.

There are many Sindhi language television channels broadcasting in Pakistan such as Time News, KTN, Sindh TV, Awaz Television Network, Mehran TV, and Dharti TV.

Dialects

Sindhi has many dialects, and forms a dialect continuum at some places with neighboring languages such as Saraiki and Gujarati. Some of the dialects are:

 Vicholi: The prestige dialect spoken around Hyderabad and central Sindh (the Vicholo region). The literary standard of Sindhi is based on this dialect.
 Uttaradi: spoken in Uttar region meaning north in sindhi, with small differences in Larkana, Shikarpur and in parts of Sukkur and Kandiaro.
 Lari: The dialect of southern Sindh (Lāṛu) spoken around areas like Karachi, Thatta and Sujawal.
 Siroli or Siraiki: The dialect of northern most Sindh (Siro) means head in Sindhi.  Spoken in all over sindh but majority is in Jacobabad and Kashmore, it has little similarity with the Saraiki language  of South Punjab and has variously been treated either as a dialect of Saraiki or as a dialect of Sindhi.
 Lasi: The dialect of Lasbela District in Balochistan, closely related to Lari and Vicholi, and in contact with Balochi.
 Firaqi Sindhi: spoken in north eastern districts of balochistan, where it is referred to as firaqi sindhi or commonly just sindhi.
 Kutchi: is a dialect of Sindhi, spoken in kutch district of gujarat, over time, Kutchi has borrowed vocabulary from Gujarati.
 Dhatki/Dhatti/Thareli: A dialect of sindhi spoken in Tharparkar, Umerkot in Pakistan and Jaisalmer and Barmer in India.
 Jadgali: is a dialect of Sindhi most closely related to Lasi, Jadgali is spoken in Balochistan and Iran.
 Sindhi Bhil: It is a dialect spoken in Sindh by meghwars and bheels, Sindhi Bhil is known to have many old Sindhi words, which were lost after Arabic, Persian, and Chaghatai influence.

Phonology
Sindhi has a relatively large inventory of both consonants and vowels compared to other languages.  Sindhi has 46 consonant phonemes and 16 vowels. The consonant to vowel ratio is around average for the world's languages at 2.8. All plosives, affricates, nasals, the retroflex flap, and the lateral approximant /l/ have aspirated or breathy voiced counterparts. The language also features four implosives.

Consonants

The retroflex consonants are apical postalveolar and do not involve curling back of the tip of the tongue, so they could be transcribed  in phonetic transcription. The affricates  are laminal post-alveolars with a relatively short release. It is not clear if  is similar, or truly palatal.  is realized as labiovelar  or labiodental  in free variation, but is not common, except before a stop.

Vowels
The vowels are modal length  and short . Consonants following short vowels are lengthened:  'leaf' vs.  'worn'.

Vocabulary
According to historian Nabi Bux Baloch, most Sindhi vocabulary is from ancient Sanskrit. However, owing to the influence of the Persian language over the subcontinent, Sindhi has adapted many words from Persian and Arabic. It has also borrowed from English and Hindustani. Today, Sindhi in Pakistan is slightly influenced by Urdu, with more borrowed Perso-Arabic elements, while Sindhi in India is influenced by Hindi, with more borrowed tatsam Sanskrit elements.

Writing systems
Sindhis in Pakistan use a version of the Perso-Arabic script with new letters adapted to Sindhi phonology, while in India a greater variety of scripts are in use, including Devanagari, Khudabadi, Khojki, and Gurmukhi. Perso-Arabic for Sindhi was also made digitally accessible relatively earlier.

The earliest attested records in Sindhi are from the 15th century. Before the standardisation of Sindhi orthography, numerous forms of Devanagari and Laṇḍā scripts were used for trading. For literary and religious purposes, a Perso-Arabic script developed by Abul-Hasan as-Sindi and Gurmukhi (a subset of Laṇḍā) were used. Another two scripts, Khudabadi and Shikarpuri, were reforms of the Landa script. During British rule in the late 19th century, the Perso-Arabic script was decreed standard over Devanagari.

Laṇḍā scripts
Laṇḍā-based scripts, such as Gurmukhi, Khojki, and the Khudabadi script were used historically to write Sindhi.

Khudabadi

The Khudabadi alphabet was invented in 1550 CE, and was used alongside other scripts by the Hindu community until the colonial era, where the sole usage of the Arabic script for official purposes was legislated.

The script continued to be used on a smaller scale by the trader community until the Partition of India in 1947.

Khojki
Khojki was employed primarily to record Muslim Shia Ismaili religious literature, as well as literature for a few secret Shia Muslim sects.

Gurmukhi
The Gurmukhi script was also used to write Sindhi, mainly in India by Hindus.

Perso-Arabic script 

During British rule in India, a variant of the Persian alphabet was adopted for Sindhi in the 19th century. The script is used in Pakistan and India today. It has a total of 52 letters, augmenting the Persian with digraphs and eighteen new letters for sounds particular to Sindhi and other Indo-Aryan languages. Some letters that are distinguished in Arabic or Persian are homophones in Sindhi.

Devanagari script 
In India, the Devanagari script is also used to write Sindhi. A modern version was introduced by the government of India in 1948; however, it did not gain full acceptance, so both the Sindhi-Arabic and Devanagari scripts are used. In India, a person may write a Sindhi language paper for a Civil Services Examination in either script. Diacritical bars below the letter are used to mark implosive consonants, and dots called nukta are used to form other additional consonants.

Roman Sindhi 

The Sindhi-Roman script or Roman-Sindhi script is the contemporary Sindhi script usually used by the Sindhis when texting messages on their mobile phones.

Advocacy 

 Sindhi language was made the official language of Sindh according to 1972 Sindhi Language Bill.
 All Educational institutes in Sindh are mandated to teach Sindhi as per the bill

Software 
By 2001, Abdul-Majid Bhurgri had coordinated with Microsoft to develop Unicode-based Software in the form of the Perso-Arabic Sindhi script which afterwards became the basis for the communicated use by Sindhi speakers around the world. Later on Google introduced the first automated translator for Sindhi language in 2016.

In June 2014, the Khudabadi script of the Sindhi language was added to Unicode, However as of now the script currently has no proper rendering support to view it in unsupported devices.

See also

 1972 Sindhi Language Bill
 Institute of Sindhology
 Sindhi Transliteration
 Languages of India
 Languages of Pakistan
 Languages with official status in India
 List of Sindhi-language films
 Provincial languages of Pakistan
 Sindhi literature
 Sindhi poetry

Notes

References

Sources

External links

 Sindhi Language Authority
 Sindhi Dictionary
 
 Mewaram's 1910 Sindhi-English dictionary

 
Northwestern Indo-Aryan languages
Languages of Sindh
Official languages of India
Subject–object–verb languages
Languages of Gujarat
Languages of Rajasthan
Languages of Maharashtra
Languages written in Indic scripts
Sahitya Akademi recognised languages